The enzyme glutathione thiolesterase (EC 3.1.2.7) catalyzes the reaction

S-acylglutathione + H2O  glutathione + a carboxylate

This enzyme belongs to the family of hydrolases, specifically those acting on thioester bonds.  The systematic name is S-acylglutathione hydrolase. It is also called citryl-glutathione thioesterhydrolase.

References

 

EC 3.1.2
Enzymes of unknown structure